Caibiran (IPA: [kɐʔɪbɪ'ɾan]), officially the Municipality of Caibiran, is a 5th class municipality in the province of Biliran, Philippines. According to the 2020 census, it has a population of 24,167 people. The town's populace predominantly speak Waray language.

Geography
According to the Philippine Statistics Authority, the municipality has a land area of  constituting  of the  total area of Biliran.

Barangays
Caibiran is politically subdivided into 17 barangays. In 1948, the barangays of Ungale, Tuo, and Inasuyan were transferred to Kawayan, Biliran.

Climate

Demographics

In the 2020 census, Caibiran had a population of 24,167.

Economy

References

External links

 [ Philippine Standard Geographic Code]

Municipalities of Biliran